Kharavan may refer to:
 Kharavan-e Olya
 Kharavan-e Sofla